Viluppuram Bus Station, popularly known as Villupuram New Bus Stand, is one of the bus terminus of Viluppuram, the other being the Viluppuram Old Bus Stand that is primarily used for intra-city buses. Tamil Nadu State Transport Corporation services both mofussil and town buses to the station. By area-wise it is one of the largest bus terminus in Tamil Nadu.

Services 

Due to the town's location between Chennai and Tiruchirapalli, all south-bound buses from State capital Chennai have to pass the terminus. The terminus is managed by Department of Transport (Tamil Nadu). This terminus servicing the premium buses which are operated by SETC.

Connections 

References

External links 
 State Transport Undertakings

Bus stations in Tamil Nadu
Transport infrastructure completed in 2000
Viluppuram district